Michael Cristofer (born January 22, 1945) is an American actor, playwright and filmmaker. He received the Pulitzer Prize for Drama and the Tony Award for Best Play for The Shadow Box in 1977. From 2015 to 2019, he played the role of Phillip Price in the television series Mr. Robot.

Life and career

Cristofer was born Michael Procaccino in Trenton, New Jersey, the son of Mary and Joseph Procaccino. He started his theatrical career as an actor, primarily on stage. He also started writing plays. He has also written numerous screenplays for film.

Cristofer was awarded a Pulitzer Prize for Drama and a Tony Award for the Broadway production of his play The Shadow Box (1977). Other plays include Breaking Up at Primary Stages; Ice at Manhattan Theatre Club; Black Angel at Circle Repertory Company; The Lady and the Clarinet (starring Stockard Channing), produced by the Mark Taper Forum, Long Wharf Theater, Off-Broadway and on the London Fringe; and Amazing Grace (1996; starring Marsha Mason), which received the American Theater Critics Award as the best play produced in the United States during the 1996–1997 season.

Cristofer's film work includes the screenplays for The Shadow Box, directed by Paul Newman (Golden Globe Award, Emmy nomination); Falling in Love; The Witches of Eastwick, adapted from the novel by John Updike; The Bonfire of the Vanities, adapted from the novel by Tom Wolfe and directed by Brian De Palma; Breaking Up, and Casanova.

His directing credits include Gia, starring Angelina Jolie, Mercedes Ruehl and Faye Dunaway, which was nominated for five Emmy Awards and for which he won a Directors Guild Award. He next directed Body Shots; and Original Sin, released in 2001.

For eight years, he worked as artistic advisor and finally co-artistic director of River Arts Repertory in Woodstock, New York, a company which produced plays by writers such as Richard Nelson, Mac Wellman, and Eric Overmeyer, including the American premiere of Edward Albee's Three Tall Women, a production that later moved to Off-Broadway.

Also at River Arts, he wrote stage adaptations of the films Love Me or Leave Me and Casablanca. He directed Joanne Woodward in his adaptation of Henrik Ibsen's Ghosts. His most recent work for the theater, The Whore and Mr. Moore, premiered at Dorset Theatre Festival's 2012 summer season. He collaborated with trumpeter Terence Blanchard, writing the libretto for Champion, a boxing opera in jazz music based on the life of prize fighter Emile Griffith. It premiered in June 2013 at Opera Theater of St. Louis. His work Execution of the Caregiver is based on the true story of a woman in South Carolina who killed her mother, fiancé and several people for whom she purportedly was caring.

After a 15-year hiatus, Cristofer returned to his acting career, appearing in Romeo and Juliet (New York Shakespeare Festival), Trumpery by Peter Parnell, Three Sisters (Williamstown Theater), Body of Water (with Christine Lahti), and the Broadway revival of A View from the Bridge (starring Liev Schreiber and Scarlett Johansson). He recently appeared in The Other Woman (with Natalie Portman), and created the role of Gus in Tony Kushner's The Intelligent Homosexual's Guide to Capitalism and Socialism with a Key to the Scriptures at the Public Theater.

In 2010, Cristofer was a cast member on Rubicon, in which he played Truxton Spangler. In 2012, he played Jerry Rand on Smash.

In 2013–2014, he played millionaire witch-hunter Harrison Renard in American Horror Story: Coven. In 2015, Cristofer made guest appearances in four episodes of season one of Mr. Robot as Phillip Price, the shadowy CEO of the sinister E Corp, and he became a cast member in season two, three, and four.

Works

Plays
 The Shadow Box (1975)
 Black Angel (1978)
 The Lady and the Clarinet (1980)
 Breaking Up (1990)
 The Blues Are Running (1996)
 Man in the Ring (2016)

Films

Acting roles

Television

Acting roles

References

External links
 
 
 

1945 births
20th-century American dramatists and playwrights
20th-century American male actors
20th-century American male writers
21st-century American dramatists and playwrights
21st-century American male actors
21st-century American male writers
Actors from Trenton, New Jersey
American male dramatists and playwrights
American male film actors
American male screenwriters
American opera librettists
Film directors from New Jersey
Living people
Male actors from New Jersey
Pulitzer Prize for Drama winners
Screenwriters from New Jersey
Writers from Trenton, New Jersey